Ukraine competed at the 1999 Winter Universiade in Poprad, Slovakia. Ukraine won 7 medals: four gold, one silver, and two bronze medals.

Medallists

Figure skating

See also
 Ukraine at the 1999 Summer Universiade

References

Sources
 Results

Ukraine at the Winter Universiade
Winter Universiade
1999 Winter Universiade